Imperial Bank South Africa Limited, also referred to as Imperial Bank South Africa (IBSA), but commonly known as Imperial Bank, is a commercial bank in the Republic of South Africa. It is licensed as a locally controlled financial institution by the Reserve Bank of South Africa, the national banking regulator.

History
The bank was established in 1996 by Imperial Holdings Limited. In 2001, the Nedbank Group acquired 50.1% controlling interest in the bank. Imperial Holdings retained 49.9% shareholding. In August 2009, the Nedbank Group acquired the 49.9% that it already did not own, thereby becoming the sole owner of the bank.

Branch network
, IBSA maintained headquarters at 24 Achter Road, Sandton, Rivonia, Johannesburg, South Africa. No other information is available about the branches of the bank.

Governance
The Chairman of the ten (10) person Board of Directors, is Hubert Brody, a non-Executive Director. The Managing Director and Chief Executive Officer is René Van Wyk.

External links
  Website of Imperial Bank South Africa
  Website of Reserve Bank of South Africa

See also

List of banks in South Africa
South African Reserve Bank
Economy of South Africa
Banking in South Africa
Nedbank Group

References

Banks of South Africa
Financial services companies of South Africa
Companies based in Sandton
Banks established in 1996